Kilmacduagh Monastery is a ruined abbey near the town of Gort in County Galway, Ireland. It was the birthplace of the Diocese of Kilmacduagh. It was reportedly founded by Saint Colman, son of Duagh in the 7th century, on land given him by his cousin King Guaire Aidne mac Colmáin of Connacht.

Overview
Kilmacduagh Monastery is located in a small village of the same name, about 5 km from the town of Gort.

The name of the place translates as "church of Duagh's son". It was reportedly the 7th century Saint Colman, son of Duagh who established a monastery here on land given to him by his cousin King Guaire Aidne mac Colmáin of Connacht, who had a fortified dwelling near what is today Dunguaire Castle.

History
As with most dates from this period, the year in which the monastery was founded is somewhat uncertain, but apparently the early 7th century is deemed the most likely.

Colman was abbot/bishop at the monastery until his death. Of his successors, only one appears in the annals by name, one Indrect (died 814), before the arrival of the English.

This site was of such importance in medieval times that it became the centre of a new diocese, or Bishop's seat, the Diocese of Kilmacduagh, in the 12th century.

The early monastery was victim of multiple raids and finally ruined by William de Burgh in the early 13th century. To replace it, the local lord Owen O'Heyne (died 1253) founded the abbey of St. Mary de Petra as house for the Augustinian canons. The abbey is also attributed to Bishop Maurice Ileyan (died 1283) but the architectural evidence, according to Harold Leask, allows only the later added east range of the abbey to be associated with bishop Maurice. During the reformation this was granted to the Earl of Clanricarde.

The round tower was repaired in 1879  under the supervision of Sir Thomas Deane, with financial support from Sir William Henry Gregory of Coole Park.

The Diocese of Kilmacduagh is now incorporated into the United Dioceses of Tuam and Limerick in the Church of Ireland and in the Roman Catholic divisions, into the Diocese of Galway.

Today

The ruins of the monastery are sometimes referred to as "the seven Churches". However, not all of these buildings were actually churches, none of them dates back to the 7th century. The buildings are:
 The abbey church, former cathedral, or Teampuil Mor, in the graveyard
 The "Church of Mary" or Teampuil Muire (also known as "The Lady's Church"), east of the road
 The "Church of St. John the Baptist" or Teampuil Eoin Baiste, to the north of the graveyard
 The "Abbot's House" or Seanclogh, further north, close to the road
 Teampuil Beg Mac Duagh, south of the graveyard
 The "Monastery Church" or "O'Heyne's Church" (or "O'Heyne's Abbey"), ca. 180 metres north-east of the graveyard (13th century)
 The round tower, roughly 15 metres south-west of the cathedral

The round tower is notable both as a fine example of this particularly Irish feature but also because of its noticeable lean, over half a metre from the vertical. The tower probably dates from the 10th century.

Legends

According to legend, Saint Colman MacDuagh was walking through the woods of the Burren when his girdle fell to the ground. Taking this as a sign, he built his monastery on that spot. The girdle was said to be studded with gems and was held by the O'Shaughnessys centuries later, along with St. Colman's crozier, or staff. The girdle was later lost, but the crozier came to be held by the O'Heynes and may now be seen in the National Museum of Ireland.

It is said that, in the Diocese of Kilmacduagh, no man will ever die from lightning. This legend was put to the test when one unlucky soul was struck, but the force of the bolt made him fly through the air into neighbouring County Clare, where he died.

See also
Bishop of Kilmacduagh (Pre- and Post-Reformation)
Bishop of Kilmacduagh and Kilfenora (Roman Catholic)
Bishop of Clonfert and Kilmacduagh (Church of Ireland)
List of abbeys and priories in Ireland (County Galway)
Dean of Kilmacduagh

References

 A New History of Ireland, volume 9, pp. 330–331.
 Fahey, Jerome, The history and antiquities of the diocese of Kilmacduagh, Dublin, M. H. Gill & son, 1893. (available online at archive.org)

Annalistic references
 814. Innreachtach, Bishop of Cill Mic Duach;
 846. Colman, son of Donncothaigh, successor of Colman, of Cill Mic Duach, died.
 M1199.10. John de Courcy, with the English of Ulidia, and the son of Hugo De Lacy, with the English of Meath, marched to '''Kilmacduagh to assist Cathal Crovderg O'Conor. Cathal Carragh, accompanied by the Connacians, came, and gave them battle: and the English of Ulidia and Meath were defeated with such slaughter that, of their five battalions, only two survived; and these were pursued from the field of battle to Rindown on Lough Ree, in which place John was completely hemmed in. Many of his English were killed, and others were drowned; for they found no passage by which to escape, except by crossing the lake in boats.External links

O’Donovan, John (ed. and tr.). Annála Rioghachta Éireann. Annals of the Kingdom of Ireland by the Four Masters, from the earliest period to the year 1616. Edited from MSS in the Library of the Royal Irish Academy and of Trinity College Dublin with a translation and copious notes''. 7 vols. Royal Irish Academy. Dublin, 1848–51. Vol. 1 available from the Internet Archive. Available from CELT:
Vol. 1 (2242 BC – AD 902): edition and translation
Vol. 2 (AD 903–1171): edition and translation
Vol. 3 (AD 1172–1372): edition and translation
Vol. 4 (AD 1373–1500): edition and translation
Vol. 5 (AD 1501–1588): edition and translation
Vol. 6 (AD 1589–1616): edition and translation
  (Note: The website incorrectly calls the book "The history of the popes, from the close of the Middle Ages", but when downloaded or read online it is volume 4.)

Christian monasteries in the Republic of Ireland
Buildings and structures in County Galway
Religion in County Galway
Ruins in the Republic of Ireland
Christian monasteries established in the 7th century
Towers in the Republic of Ireland
Former populated places in Ireland
National Monuments in County Galway
Inclined towers
Ruined abbeys and monasteries
Christian bell towers
7th-century churches in Ireland
Former cathedrals in Ireland